A  is the title for a hereditary leader of a Batswana tribe.

Usage
The word "kgosi" is a Setswana term for "king" or "chief". Various affixes can be added to the word to change its meaning: adding the prefix di- creates the plural form dikgosi; the feminine suffix -gadi makes the word kgosigadi; and the adjectival suffix -kgolo, meaning "large", creates kgosikgolo, the word for "supreme leader".

It is a title often given to aristocrats in Botswana and surrounding countries where there are Tswana speaking people.
The office of tribal leadership is called the bogosi while the person who assumes the office is the kgosi.

Duties
The Bogosi Act of 2008 defines the powers of dikgosi. According to the Bogosi Act, the kgosi of a tribe has several duties: to manage the tribe, to organize kgotla meetings, and to follow the rules and advice of the national government and the members of the tribe. The dikgosi of the eight main Batswana tribes automatically become members of the Ntlo ya Dikgosi, an advisory body within the Parliament of Botswana.

The kgosi has the ability to appoint a mothusa kgosi who acts as an acting leader while the kgosi is temporarily unable to perform his or her duties. This is different from the motshwarelela bogosi, an office created when the kgosi is permanently unable to perform his or her duties and a replacement kgosi is needed.

The act has been criticised by tribal leaders because of the limitations on the powers of a kgosi. In 2010, Kgosi Kgafela II of the Kgatla tribe was accused of flogging, but he argued that dikgosi have immunity to the state's jurisdiction. The Botswana High Court dismissed the case on 11 May 2011, claiming that "dikgosi cannot act outside the constitution and laws prescribed by Parliament when all other functionaries of the state act within the statutory limitations." To avoid the legal costs of the case, Kgafela moved to Moruleng, South Africa.

Citations

References

External links

 Traditional Government and Social Order as explained by the Embassy of Botswana in Japan
https://www.sundaystandard.info/the-kgosi-chronicles-part-one-defining-the-problem/

Positions of authority
Titles